Illyria is a historical region in Southeastern Europe, inhabited in antiquity by the Illyrians.

Illyria may also refer to:

Places
 Roman Illyria or Illyricum, a region of the Roman Empire, incorporating ancient Illyria and surrounding regions
 A general early modern reference to areas speaking Illyrian (Slavic) or were involved in the late modern Illyrian movement
 Illyrian Provinces (1809–14), a division of the First French Empire, situated on eastern coast of the Adriatic Sea
 Kingdom of Illyria (1816–49), a crown land of the Austrian Empire

Arts and entertainment
 Illyria (Angel), a fictional character in the Angel TV series created by Joss Whedon
 Illyria (musical), a musical with book, music, and lyrics by Pete Mills
 Illyria, a novella by Elizabeth Hand
 Illyria (play), a play by Bryony Lavery
 Illyria, a play by writer/director Richard Nelson
 Illyria, a county in which William Shakespeare's Twelfth Night is set
 Illyria, a fictional Eastern European country from the play Dirty Hands by Jean-Paul Sartre
Illyria, a fictional place occupied by the Illyrians in the book series A Court of Thorns and Roses by Sarah J. Maas

Other uses
 Illyria, a ferry, launched as 
 1160 Illyria, an asteroid discovered by Karl Wilhelm Reinmuth
 Illyria (cicada), a genus of translucent cicadas
 Illyria (village), in Luhansk Oblast, Ukraine
 Albanian patrol vessel Iliria (P 131), a 42-metre, 240 ton, Albanian patrol vessel
 Illyria Pty Ltd., an Australian investment company owned by American mass media businessman Lachlan Murdoch

See also
 Iliria College, Iliria Royal University Prishtina
 Illyrian (disambiguation)
 Illyrians (disambiguation)
 Illyricum (disambiguation)
 Illyricus (disambiguation)